Hypsopygia bamakoensis is a species of snout moth in the genus Hypsopygia. It was described by Patrice J.A. Leraut in 2006 and is known from Mali.

References

Moths described in 2006
Endemic fauna of Mali
Moths of Africa
Snout moths of Africa
Pyralini